Newbiggin is a civil parish in the Eden District, Cumbria, England.  It contains 14 listed buildings that are recorded in the National Heritage List for England.  Of these, one is listed at Grade II*, the middle of the three grades, and the others are at Grade II, the lowest grade.  The parish includes the village of Newbiggin and the surrounding countryside.  The most important building is Newbiggin Hall, originally a tower house and later a country house; the hall and associated structures are listed.  The other listed buildings Include a church, items in the churchyard, a chapel, a bridge, farmhouses and farm buildings.


Key

Buildings

References

Citations

Sources

Lists of listed buildings in Cumbria